The Napier Naiad is a British turboprop gas-turbine engine designed and built by D. Napier & Son in the late 1940s. It was the company's first gas turbine engine. A twin version known as the Coupled Naiad was developed but both engine projects were cancelled before finding a market. The Naiad was also used, in adapted form, in the Napier Nomad turbo-compound engine design.

Applications
Avro Lincoln - Test bed only

Engines on display
A Napier Naiad is on display at the Science Museum, London.

Specifications (Naiad)

See also

References

Notes

Bibliography

 Gunston, Bill. World Encyclopedia of Aero Engines. Cambridge, England. Patrick Stephens Limited, 1989.

External links
Cutaway drawing of Napier Naiad
"Napier Naiad" a 1948 Flight article

Napier aircraft engines
1940s turboprop engines
Axial-compressor gas turbine engines